Journal of the Royal Musical Association is a peer-reviewed academic journal covering fields ranging from historical and critical musicology to theory and analysis, ethnomusicology, and popular music studies. The journal is published by Routledge on behalf of the Royal Musical Association and the editor-in-chief is Freya Jarman.

Abstracting and indexing 
The journal is abstracted and indexed in:

External links 
 

Taylor & Francis academic journals
English-language journals
Publications established in 1874
Music journals
Biannual journals